Lorentzweiler is a commune and small town in central Luxembourg, in the canton of Mersch. It is situated on the river Alzette.

, the town of Lorentzweiler, which lies in the centre of the commune, has a population of 743.  Other towns within the commune include Blaschette, Bofferdange, and Helmdange, Hunsdorf.

Population

References

External links
 

 
Communes in Mersch (canton)
Towns in Luxembourg